The 1995 Canadian Open, also known by its sponsored name Du Maurier Canadian Open, was a men's and women's professional tennis tournament played on outdoor hard courts that was part of the Championship Series, Single Week of the 1995 ATP Tour, and of Tier I of the 1995 WTA Tour. The men's event took place at the Jarry Stadium in Montreal, Quebec, Canada, from July 24 through July 31, 1995, and the women's event at the National Tennis Centre in Toronto, Ontario, Canada, from August 13 through August 20, 1995. First-seeded Andre Agassi, the defending champion, and Monica Seles won the singles titles. It was Seles' first tournament back after being stabbed during a match at the WTA Hamburg in April 1993.

Finals

Men's singles

 Andre Agassi defeated  Pete Sampras, 3–6, 6–2, 6–3
It was Andre Agassi's 5th title of the year and his 29th overall. It was his 2nd Masters title of the year and his 6th overall. It was his 3rd win at the event, also winning in 1992 and 1994.

Women's singles

 Monica Seles defeated  Amanda Coetzer, 6–0, 6–1
It was Monica Seles' 1st title of the year and her 33rd overall. It was her 1st Tier I title of the year and her 5th overall.

Men's doubles

 Yevgeny Kafelnikov /  Andrei Olhovskiy defeated  Brian MacPhie /  Sandon Stolle, 6–4, 6–4

Women's doubles

 Brenda Schultz-McCarthy /  Gabriela Sabatini defeated  Martina Hingis /  Iva Majoli 4–6, 6–0, 6–3

See also
 Agassi–Sampras rivalry

References

External links
 
 Association of Tennis Professionals (ATP) tournament profile
 Women's Tennis Association (WTA) tournament profile
 ITF men's tournament event details
 ITF women's tournament event details

 
Canadian Open
Canadian Open
Canadian Open (tennis)
1995 in Canadian tennis